The Commonwealth Games is a quadrennial event which began in 1930 as the British Empire Games. The Commonwealth Games Federation accepts only athletes from the Commonwealth of Nations and recognises records set at editions of the Commonwealth Games. The athletics events at the Games are divided into four groups: track events (including sprints, middle- and long-distance running, hurdling and relays), field events (including javelin, discus, hammer, pole vault, long and triple jumps), road events and combined events (triathlon, heptathlon and decathlon). There are also several track and field events held for disabled athletes.

Many Commonwealth Games records were set over distances using imperial measurements, such as the 100-yard dash, and (as a result of metric standardisation in 1966) many records belong to defunct events. The oldest record is George Bailey's 9:52.0 minutes in the seldom used men's two mile steeplechase, which was set at the inaugural Games. The two longest lasting records in current events were both set at the 1974 edition of the Games: Englishman Ian Thompson's record of 2:09:12 hours in the Marathon, and Tanzanian Filbert Bayi's record of 3:32.16 minutes in the 1500 metres, which was also a world record.

Nathan Deakes holds two Commonwealth Games records: the 20 km and 50 km walk events. Adekunle Adesoji and Chantal Petitclerc also hold two records each in the para-sports events.

Men's records

Statistics are correct as of August 2022

Notes

Women's records

Statistics are correct as of August 2022

Notes

Men's para-sports records

Women's para-sports records

See also

List of world records in athletics
List of Olympic records in athletics
List of World Championships in Athletics records

References

General
Commonwealth Games Athletics Records. Commonwealth of Nations. Retrieved on 2009-07-27.
Commonwealth Games Stats. Track & Field News. Retrieved on 2010-10-08.

Specific

External links
 Commonwealth Games official website
 Search record database

Athletics
Commonwealth Games
R